Kendall VanHook Bumpass (November 6, 1809 – 1885) was a cowboy and early settler, who, in 1865, broke through the surface of a scalding hot mudpot in an active geothermal area and consequently lost a leg by amputation. The geothermal area was later named "Bumpass Hell", and is today located in Lassen Volcanic National Park in California.

References

1809 births
1885 deaths
American pioneers
American amputees